The 1986 D.C. National Bank Classic was a men's tennis tournament and was played on outdoor green clay courts. The event was part of the 1986 Grand Prix circuit. It was the 18th edition of the tournament and was held at Rock Creek Park in Washington, D.C. from July 28 through August 3, 1986. Unseeded Karel Nováček won the singles title after defeating five seeded players and earned $37,400 first-prize money.

Finals

Singles

 Karel Nováček defeated  Thierry Tulasne 6–1, 7–6(7–4)
 It was Nováček's first singles title of his career.

Doubles

 Hans Gildemeister /  Andrés Gómez defeated  Ricardo Acioly /  César Kist 6–3, 7–5

References

External links
 ATP tournament profile
 ITF tournament editions details

Washington Open (tennis)
Washington Star International
Washington Star International
Washington Star International